The 1996 US Open was a tennis tournament played on outdoor hard courts at the USTA National Tennis Center in New York City in New York in the United States. It was the 116th edition of the US Open and was held from August 26 through September 8, 1996.

Seniors

Men's singles

 Pete Sampras defeated  Michael Chang 6–1, 6–4, 7–6(7–3)
 It was Sampras' 8th career Grand Slam title and his 4th US Open title.

Women's singles

 Steffi Graf defeated  Monica Seles 7–5, 6–4 
 It was Graf's 21st career Grand Slam title and her 5th and last US Open title.

Men's doubles

 Todd Woodbridge /  Mark Woodforde defeated  Jacco Eltingh /  Paul Haarhuis 4–6, 7–6(7–5), 7–6(7–2)
 It was Woodbridge's 12th career Grand Slam title and his 4th US Open title. It was Woodforde's 13th career Grand Slam title and his 4th and last US Open title.

Women's doubles

 Gigi Fernández /  Natasha Zvereva defeated  Jana Novotná /  Arantxa Sánchez Vicario 1–6, 6–1, 6–4 
 It was Fernández's 15th career Grand Slam title and her 5th and last US Open title. It was Zvereva's 17th career Grand Slam title and her 4th and last US Open title.

Mixed doubles

 Lisa Raymond /  Patrick Galbraith defeated  Manon Bollegraf /  Rick Leach 7–6 (8–6), 7–6 (7–4)
 It was Raymond's 1st career Grand Slam title and her 1st US Open title. It was Galbraith's 2nd and last career Grand Slam title and his 2nd US Open title.

Juniors

Boys' singles
 Daniel Elsner defeated  Markus Hipfl 6–3, 6–2

Girls' singles
 Mirjana Lučić defeated  Marlene Weingärtner 6–2, 6–1

Boys' doubles
 Bob Bryan /  Mike Bryan defeated  Daniele Bracciali /  Jocelyn Robichaud 5–7, 6–3, 6–4

Girls' doubles
 Surina de Beer /  Jessica Steck defeated  Petra Rampre /  Katarina Srebotnik 6–4, 6–3

Other events

Men's 35s doubles masters
 Johan Kriek /  John Lloyd defeated  Vijay Amritraj /  Tim Wilkison 6–4, 6–4

Men's 45s doubles masters
 Tom Gullikson /  Dick Stockton defeated  Bob Lutz /  Stan Smith 6–4, 6–2

Women's doubles masters
 Anne Hobbs /  Virginia Wade defeated  Jo Durie /  Valerie Ziegenfuss 6–2, 6–2

Mixed doubles masters
 Wendy Turnbull /  Tom Okker vs.  Jo Durie /  Tom Gorman (abandoned due to rain)

External links
 Official US Open website

 
 

 
US Open
US Open (tennis) by year
US Open (tennis)
US Open (tennis)
US Open (tennis)
US Open (tennis)